The 2015 Metro Atlantic Athletic Conference (MAAC) softball tournament was held at Demske Sports Complex Complex on the campus of the Canisius College in Buffalo, New York, from May 6 through May 9, 2015.  The tournament winner will earn the MAAC's automatic bid to the 2015 NCAA Division I softball tournament. All games will be streamed online on MAAC.TV.

Tournament

All times listed are Eastern Daylight Time.

References

Metro Atlantic Athletic Conference Tournament
Tournament, 2015